Henri Barki is a Turkish-Canadian social scientist, and was a Canada Research Chair at HEC Montréal, Université de Montréal until he retired in 2017.

Partial Bibliography

Scholarly publications with Henri Barki as the lead author 

A Contingency Model of DSS Success: An Empirical Investigation
Barki, Henri
ProQuest Dissertations Publishing; 1984

Implementing Decision Support Systems: A Research Framework
Barki, Henri; Huff, Sid L.
Canadian Journal of Administrative Sciences / Revue Canadienne des Sciences de l'Administration, June 1984, 1(1): 95-110

Change, attitude to change, and decision support system success
Barki, Henri; Huff, Sid L.
Information & Management, 1985, 9(5): 261-268

An Information Systems Keyword Classification Scheme
Barki, Henri; Rivard, Suzanne; Talbot, Jean
MIS Quarterly, June 1988, 12(2): 299

Rethinking The Concept Of User Involvement
Barki, Henri; Hartwick, Jon
MIS Quarterly, March 1989, 13(1): 53

Implementing Decision Support Systems: Correlates of User Satisfaction and System Usage
Barki, Henri; Huff, Sid
INFOR, May 1990, 28(2): 89

The Measurement of Risk in an Information System Development Project
Barki, Henri; Rivard, Suzanne; Talbot, Jean
Revue Canadienne des Sciences de l'Administration/Canadian Journal of Administrative Sciences, September 1992, 9(3): 213-228

A Keyword Classification Scheme for IS Research Literature: An Update
Barki, Henri; Rivard, Suzanne; Talbot, Jean
MIS Quarterly, June 1993, 17(2): 209-226

Toward an Assessment of Software Development Risk
Barki, Henri; Rivard, Suzanne; Talbot, Jean
Journal of Management Information Systems, September 1993, 10(2): 203-225

Measuring User Participation, User Involvement, and User Attitude
Barki, Henri; Hartwick, Jon
MIS Quarterly, 1 March 1994, 18(1): 59-82

User participation, conflict, and conflict resolution: The mediating roles of influence
Barki, Henri; Hartwick, Jon
Information Systems Research, December 1994, 5(4): 422

An Integrative Contingency Model of Software Project Risk Management
Barki, Henri; Rivard, Suzanne; Talbot, Jean
Journal of Management Information Systems, March 2001, 17(4): 37-69

Small Group Brainstorming and Idea Quality: Is Electronic Brainstorming the Most Effective Approach?
Barki, Henri; Pinsonneault, Alain
Small Group Research, April 2001, 32(2): 158-205

Interpersonal Conflict and Its Management in Information System Development
Barki, Henri; Hartwick, Jon
MIS Quarterly, June 2001, 25(2): 195-228

Conceptualizing the Construct of Interpersonal Conflict
Barki, Henri; Hartwick, Jon
International Journal of Conflict Management, March 2004, 15(3): 216-244

A Model of Organizational Integration, Implementation Effort, and Performance
Barki, Henri; Pinsonneault, Alain
Organization Science, 2005, 16(2): 165-179

EIS Implementation Research: An Assessment and Suggestions for the Future
(book chapter)
Barki, Henri; Chen, Chin-Sheng (Editor); Filipe, Joaquim (Editor); Seruca, Isabel (Editor); Cordeiro, José (Editor)
Dordrecht: Springer Netherlands; 2006
Enterprise Information Systems VII, pp.3-10

Information System Use–Related Activity: An Expanded Behavioral Conceptualization of Individual-Level Information System Use
Barki, Henri; Titah, Ryad; Boffo, Céline
Information Systems Research, 2007, 18(2): 173-192

Thar's gold in them thar constructs
Barki, Henri
ACM SIGMIS Database: The Database for Advances in Information Systems, October 2008, 39(4): 90

Linking IT Implementation and Acceptance via the Construct of Psychological Ownership of Information Technology
Barki, Henri; Pare, Guy; Sicotte, Claude
Journal of Information Technology, December 2008, 23(4): 269-280

Managing Illusions of Control
Barki, Henri
Journal of Information Technology, December 2011, 26(4): 280-281

Reconceptualizing trust: A non-linear Boolean model
Barki, Henri; Robert, Jacques; Dulipovici, Alina
Information & Management, 2015, 52(4): 483-495

References

Year of birth missing (living people)
Living people
Academic staff of the Université de Montréal
Canadian social scientists
University of Western Ontario alumni